Tetraspanin 10 is a protein that in humans is encoded by the TSPAN10 gene.

References

Further reading